The 1987 Grand Prix motorcycle racing season was the 39th F.I.M. Road Racing World Championship season.

Season summary
Wayne Gardner became Australia's first-ever 500cc World Champion in a season that saw him score points in every Grand Prix. Randy Mamola would finish second yet again, one point ahead of Eddie Lawson despite Lawson's five victories. The first Japanese Grand Prix in 20 years was held at the Suzuka Circuit. Along with rounds in Brazil and Argentina, the championship was becoming a real world championship.

Venezuelan Carlos Lavado's defense of his 250 crown was spoiled by injuries sustained in a pre-season crash. Anton Mang stepped up to claim his fifth world championship ahead of four other Hondas. A new brand would announce its arrival in the 250 class when an Aprilia ridden by Loris Reggiani won the San Marino Grand Prix. Garelli's Fausto Gresini won ten out of eleven races in the 125 class, but ruined his bid for a perfect season when he crashed at the last round in Jarama. Spain's Jorge Martinez won the 80cc crown for the second consecutive year.

The Portuguese round was held in Jarama, Spain because the Portuguese Federation had transferred their rights to the Jarama organisers. 1987 would be the first year that saw clutch starts replace push starts on the grounds of safety. The FIM also announced that the 80cc class would be discontinued after 1989 and that the 125 class would be restricted to single cylinder machines.

The last round was in Argentina, which had not hosted a motorcycle Grand Prix since 1982. But appalling organization of the event saw the race nearly boycotted by the riders and their teams, and the race turned out to be a farcical embarrassment for the organizers. The safety of the Autodromo Buenos Aires (which was an arena-type circuit that was comparably easy to make safe, compared to other circuits) was totally unsuitable for racing; the organization of this Grand Prix was so bad that spectators had easy access to the circuit while the races were going on. The Argentine Grand Prix did not return until 1994.

1987 Grand Prix season calendar
The following Grands Prix were scheduled to take place in 1987:

Calendar changes
 The Japanese Grand Prix was added to the calendar after a 20-year absence. The venue hosting the race was the Suzuka Circuit instead of the previously used Fuji Speedway.
 The Spanish Grand Prix moved from the Jarama to the Jerez circuit.
 The Spanish Grand Prix was moved back, from 4 May to 29 April.
 The German Grand Prix moved from the Nürburgring to the Hockenheimring.
 The British Grand Prix moved from the Silverstone circuit to Donington Park.
 The Portuguese Grand Prix was added to the calendar. The Autódromo do Estoril was not yet suited for racing, so the Jarama circuit in Spain was chosen to host the venue instead.
 The Brazilian and Argentine Grand Prix were added to the calendar. The Brazilian round was completely new, while the Argentine round returned after a 4-year absence.

Results and standings

Grands Prix

Participants

500cc participants

250cc participants

Final standings

500cc standings

250cc standings

125cc standings

80cc standings

Further reading
 Büla, Maurice & Schertenleib, Jean-Claude (2001). Continental Circus 1949-2000. Chronosports S.A.

References

External links

Grand Prix motorcycle racing seasons
Grand Prix motorcycle racing season